Andrew W. Needham is a prominent American tax lawyer. He is a partner at Cravath, Swaine & Moore. He joined the law firm as a lateral partner in 2005 from Willkie Farr & Gallagher. Needham was among the Cravath partners who advised Johnson & Johnson in its 2011 purchase of Synthes, Inc. for $21.3 billion, then the largest acquisition by Johnson & Johnson in its history.

Needham was also part of the Cravath team that advised New Media Investment Group in its 2019 acquisition of Gannett Co., which created the largest newspaper publisher in the United States.

A native of Albany, New York, Needham attended the University of Arizona, receiving his B.A. in 1982. He earned his J.D. from Georgetown University Law Center in 1986, as well as his Master of Laws in Taxation LL.M. in 1990. Needham also received an M.B.A. from the Wharton School of the University of Pennsylvania in 1992.

Needham became a partner at Willkie Farr & Gallagher in 1997. In 2005, he was hired as lateral partner by Cravath, Swaine & Moore. He was the firm's first true lateral partner in more than six decades, since Roswell Magill, a former Treasury Department official, who became a Cravath tax partner in 1943.

Publications
He is the author of several works on tax management, including articles, books and continually updated resources manuals such as Private Equity Funds. Publications include:

Guide to Tax Planning for Private Equity Funds and Portfolio Investments: Part 1 and 2; Willkie Farr & Gallagher; 2002
Private Equity Funds; Tax Management, Incorporated, 2010, updated 2015,

References

External links

1960 births
Living people
Lawyers from Albany, New York
New York (state) lawyers
University of Arizona alumni
Georgetown University Law Center alumni
Wharton School of the University of Pennsylvania alumni
Cravath, Swaine & Moore partners
People associated with Willkie Farr & Gallagher